Yarra Valley Grammar (YVG) is an independent Anglican, co-educational grammar school, located in Ringwood, a suburb of Melbourne, Australia. Yarra Valley was founded as an all boys Anglican day school in 1966 before transitioning to a co-educational model in 1978. Yarra Valley is a member of AGSV (Associated Grammar Schools of Victoria), and has been periodically ranked amongst the top 50 schools in the state according to ATAR and VCE results, being placed as the 18th school in Victoria in 2022. 

Yarra Valley Grammar has also produced various notable alumni in the areas of sport, politics and academia, including seventeen professional AFL players, four olympians and two Victorian supreme court judges.

History 
The idea of a new school for boys in Melbourne's outer eastern suburbs was conceived in 1963 by a group of locals who recognised the need for a school closer to home for their sons. One of these locals was Robin Clarke who noticed that the nearest preparatory school that would accept his son was in Kew. This prompted Clarke to establish the School Formative Committee with 16 local businessmen and community leaders to outline the idea and premise for a new school in the east.

On 31 July 1963 the committee adopted the name "Formative Committee for a School in the Yarra Valley," and John Harper was elected committee president. After its founding, the committee immediately embarked on plans to organise a fundraisers to garner money to purchase a plot of land. Tom Plummer, a founding member of the committee, formed a sub-committee for education and building, and on 2 October presented a comprehensive plan for the construction of buildings, facilities and roads as well as a plan for pupil intake over the course of a 6-year period.

On 13 January 1964 the formative committee finalised the purchase of the 71 acre Larkin property set between Wonga Park Road and Wonga Road (now Plymouth Road and Kalinda Road). By early September a "master plan" for the schools construction had been accepted by the formative committee; however, work would not commence until late 1964.

The school was officially established in 1966 as the Yarra Valley Church of England School for boys. John Pascoe was the first headmaster and John Harper became the first president of the new Yarra Valley Anglican School Council. The first assembly took place with 135 boys in attendance.

In 1970, the school was invited to become a member of the Associated Grammar Schools of Victoria. In 1972, Yarra Valley Anglican School established the first hearing unit for profoundly deaf students in the state of Victoria. Girls were admitted to the two senior levels in 1978, and the school progressively became fully co-educational from 1993 through 1995.

In 1999, the school officially changed its name to Yarra Valley Grammar. In 2006 and then in 2016, Yarra Valley Grammar celebrated its 40th birthday and 50th birthday respectively with many important events. The school celebrated its 40th birthday in a service at St Paul's Cathedral September 2006 and then its 50th birthday in 2016. In 2009, Mark Merry became principal, taking over from Neville Lincoln. In the same year a new early learning centre was opened.

In 2011, the foundation hall and a new upper primary building were opened to facilitate the expansion of the overall school.

In 2012 a fire destroyed a large part of the school's upper senior campus, including the science, mathematics and laboratory buildings. The cause of the fire was concluded to be an overheated electrical board in the science building. In 2015, a new science and mathematics building was opened to replace the one lost in the fire. The new building has been considered a state of the art design for safety and security, including heat and fire alarms, emergency chemical showers, eye washes and fire isolation sections. The new science and mathematics building was officially opened by Sir Peter Cosgrove, Governor-General of Australia and Philip Freier, Anglican Archbishop of Melbourne.

In 2017, the school's outdoor pool was demolished and replaced with an expanded drama facilities, including a new classroom and three music rooms. In later 2017 a new indoor aquatic centre was opened in partnership with Paul Sadler Swimland. In 2019, a new research centre, library and chapel were also built to replace an older building in the same location. The research centre was officially opened by Anglican Archbishop of Melbourne and Primate of the Anglican Church of Australia.

In May 2021 a new fine arts building was opened by Linda Dessau, Governor of Victoria and Philip Freier, Archbishop of Melbourne and Primate of the Anglican Church of Australia.

Curriculum 
Compulsory 'core' subjects exist from years 7 to 10 with electives being offered to students from year 9. The school provides year 11 and year 12 students the Victorian Certificate of Education (VCE), the main assessment program which ranks students in the state. The school also offers select Vocational Education and Training (VET) subjects.

Co-curriculum 
The school offers many co-curriculum programs outside of the standard curriculum. These include, but are not limited to:
 Drama productions (plays and musicals)
 ESTEAM Programs
 Music orchestras, band and choirs
 Debating
 Community Links
 Swimming, athletics, canoeing, volleyball, golf, snowsports

Academia 
Yarra Valley Grammar has periodically achieved high academic results; particularly in the last 5 years where the school has been ranked in the top 50 schools in Victoria. In 2020 Yarra Valley achieved its strongest ever academic results since the introduction of the VCE system, with 63% of students receiving an ATAR of 80 or above and 41% of students receiving an ATAR over 90. This subsequently increased the schools ranking from 44th in 2019, to 34th in 2020.

Houses 
Yarra Valley Grammar has four coloured school houses allocated by the school to each student upon entry. These houses compete at school athletics as well as during performing arts week and in music and science.

Sport 
Yarra Valley Grammar is a member of the Associated Grammar Schools of Victoria (AGSV) and competes professionally and at the amateur level with other associated member schools. Yarra Valley also conducts physical education classes, health and fitness and body wellbeing classes throughout years 7-10. The school also offers skiing and snowboarding opportunities as a part of the YVG Snow Sports Team, as well as canoeing, kayaking, equestrian and golf.

AGSV & AGSV/APS premierships 
Yarra Valley Grammar has won the following AGSV & AGSV/APS premierships.

Boys:

 Athletics (2) - 1981, 1985
 Basketball (2) - 2008, 2009
 Cricket (3) - 1985, 2011, 2014
 Golf (3) - 1989, 2018, 2019
 Hockey - 1998
 Tennis (3) - 1989, 2013, 2014
 Volleyball (16) - 1992, 1993, 1994, 1995, 1996, 1997, 1998, 2000, 2001, 2002, 2003, 2005, 2007, 2009, 2012, 2013

Girls:

 Badminton - 2010
 Basketball (3) - 2015, 2016, 2021
 Cross country (6) - 1998, 1999, 2000, 2001, 2002, 2003
 Softball - 2021
 Swimming (3) - 2001, 2002, 2005
 Volleyball (14) - 2003, 2004, 2005, 2006, 2007, 2009, 2010, 2011, 2012, 2014, 2015, 2016, 2020, 2021

Facilities

Yarra Valley Grammar offers numerous sporting, academic and specialist facilities to its students and staff as well as the local and broader community.

Sporting facilities

 Indoor basketball courts
 Open air basketball courts
 Tennis courts
 Hockey fields
 Soccer field
 Football ovals
 Indoor heated swimming pool
 Fitness centre and gym
 Table tennis courts
 Sporting pavilion

Art facilities

 Performing arts centre
 Specialised theatre rooms
 Concert and music hall
 Music studio
 Multi-story fine arts department
 Art and exhibition galleries
 Wood work facilities
 Computer labs
 Recording studio
 Industrial kitchens
 Fine Arts Centre

Academic facilities

 Senior resource centre
 Library
 Junior library
 Math and Science building
 Languages building
 Fine arts building
 Performing arts centre
 Humanities building
 Well-being centre
 Lecture theatre
 Digital collaboration space 
 Chapel

Notable alumni 
A number of students have gone on to be successful in corporate and public life:
 Peter Almond (1972) – Judge of the Supreme Court of Victoria
Andy Griffiths (1979) - Internationally Renowned Children's Author
David Lyons (1993) - Hollywood Actor
Paul Singer MVO (1995) - Official Secretary to the Governor-General; and Co-Founder and General Manager, Make a Mark Australia

Sporting careers 
 Travis Cloke
 Jason Cloke
 Cameron Cloke
 Sam Blease
 Shane Biggs
 Jordan Gysberts
 Kelvin Moore
 Andrew Moore
 Jordan Gallucci
 Andrew Moore – Port Adelaide and Richmond
Kieran Harper – North Melbourne
Sam Harper – Victorian Sheffield Shield team and Melbourne Renegades player
Grant Nel (2006) - Olympic Diver
David Culbert (1984) - Olympic Long Jumper, Sports Commentator and Director of Jump Media
Campbell Message (1992) - Paralympic Medallist
James Elmer (1988) - Olympic Hockey Player
Ryley Stoddart
Shannon Eagland
Tarni Brown
Brendon Smith
Judson Clarke

See also 
 List of schools in Victoria, Australia
 List of high schools in Victoria
 Victorian Certificate of Education

References

External links

 

Anglican secondary schools in Melbourne
Associated Grammar Schools of Victoria
Educational institutions established in 1966
Junior School Heads Association of Australia Member Schools
1966 establishments in Australia
Ringwood, Victoria
Buildings and structures in the City of Maroondah